CECOSESOLA (Central de las cooperativas de Lara, Cooperatives of Social Services of Lara State) is a hierarchy-free, solidary association of the cooperatives in Venezuela.

History 

The umbrella organization of cooperatives for social services in the state of Lara was founded in late 1967. The first project of CECOSESOLA was a funeral home. It is now the largest in the region. The Institute operates its own coffin production.

About fifty-based organizations with a total of 20,000 members (employees and users) are connected to the network. 1,200 Cooperative fashionistas work as "full-time" (trabajadores asociados) at CECOSESOLA. They get their livelihood directly from the total composite. They are paid a weekly amount in the form of a wage labor "advance" (anticipo). The payment is about twice the government-set minimum wage. This advance is based on people's requirements, so it is not the same for everyone. Those with children, for example, get more. In 2010, the turnover of the company amounted to 430 million Bolivares - around 100 million U.S. dollars.

Projects

 Barquisimeto: The organization operates three weekly markets, where every week 55,000 families – about a quarter of the urban population – provide them with fruits, vegetables and foods. 450 tonnes of fruit and vegetables are sold weekly. The prices are on average 30 percent lower than those of privately operated markets. In addition, there is a shop for home appliances and furniture, where members can buy the products with installment payments without the usual high interest rates.

In the six projects of 190,000 health care treatments are performed per year. In 2009, the newly built health center was inaugurated in CICS. Here, alternative treatments such as acupuncture and massages are offered, but also surgical procedures and laboratory and X-ray examinations. The prices are 60 percent below those of private hospitals. For members of the cooperatives certain treatments are free.

The cooperative also includes farms: Twelve organizations in the states of Lara and Trujillo with over 200 small farms (2-3 hectares) supply the markets. In some, companies will try to replace agrochemicals with biological crop protection. Small production cooperatives produce foods that are sold in the markets - bread, whole grain pasta, cereals, tomato sauce, herbs, spices, honey, fruit pulp etc. There is also a credit union and other financing and a Solidarity Fund.

References

External links
 CECOSESOLA — official website (archived 2014)
 Documentaire L'expérience Cecosesola (2014) https://vimeo.com/manage/videos/782466732

Business organizations based in Venezuela
1967 establishments in Venezuela
Cooperatives in Venezuela